Marek Pach (born 16 December 1954) is a Polish former Nordic combined skier and ski jumper who competed in the 1976 Winter Olympics.

References

1954 births
Living people
Polish male Nordic combined skiers
Polish male ski jumpers
Olympic Nordic combined skiers of Poland
Olympic ski jumpers of Poland
Nordic combined skiers at the 1976 Winter Olympics
Ski jumpers at the 1976 Winter Olympics
Sportspeople from Zakopane
20th-century Polish people